Buffalo Township is one of twenty-four townships in Ogle County, Illinois, USA.  As of the 2010 census, its population was 2,813 and it contained 1,284 housing units.

Geography
It contains the city of Polo and the unincorporated town of Buffalo Grove.

Cemeteries
The township contains these four cemeteries: Buffalo Grove, Fairmount, Reed and Saint Mary's.

Demographics

School districts
 Polo Community Unit School District 222

Political districts
 Illinois's 16th congressional district
 State House District 90
 State Senate District 45

References

External links
 City-Data.com
 Illinois State Archives
 Township Officials of Illinois

Townships in Ogle County, Illinois
Populated places established in 1849
Townships in Illinois
1849 establishments in Illinois